Baohuashan railway station is a closed railway station of Shanghai-Nanjing Intercity Railway located in Baohua, Jurong, Zhenjiang, Jiangsu, People's Republic of China. 

When the station opened in July 2010, a total of 8 trains stopped, but due to the long-term sparse passenger flow, with only about ten people on each train, the annual loss reached millions of yuan. The number of trains stopping each day was reduced to two. On 10 April 2020, the China Railway Shanghai Group closed passenger operations at stations with relatively small passenger flows, including Baohuashan railway station.

References

Railway stations in Jiangsu
Railway stations in China opened in 2010
Railway stations closed in 2020
Stations on the Shanghai–Nanjing Intercity Railway